Holand is a village in the municipality of Vega in Nordland county, Norway.

References

Villages in Nordland
Vega, Norway